Donald Duncan or Don Duncan may refer to:

 Donald B. Duncan (1896–1975), American naval officer
 Donald W. Duncan (1930–2009), American soldier and anti-war activist
 Donald F. Duncan Sr. (1892–1971), American toy manufacturer and inventor
 Donald Keith Duncan, Jamaican dental surgeon and politician

See also
Joe Don Duncan (born 1990), American football player

Duncan (surname)